Postgraduate may refer to:

 Postgraduate education- studies after the bachelor's degree level;
 Postgraduate diploma
 Postgraduate Certificate in Education- one- or two-year higher education course in England, Wales and Northern Ireland
 Postgraduate training in general dentistry
 Postgraduate certificate
 Postgraduate Certificate in Laws
 Postgraduate Certificate Program in Art Crime and Cultural Heritage Protection
 Postgraduate Medical Journal- journal
 Postgraduate Medical Education and Training Board
 Postgraduate Institute of Medical Education and Research-research center in Chandigarh, India;
 Postgraduate training in general dentistry in the United States
 Postgraduate research- university area of study after a Master's or PhD
 Postgraduate Institute of Agriculture
 Postgraduate Medicine
 Postgraduate Certificate in Higher Education